Blaze may refer to:

People
 Blaze (given name), a list of people with the name
 Blaze (surname), a list of people with the name
 Blaze Bayley, stage name of  English singer and former Wolfsbane and Iron Maiden vocalist Bayley Alexander Cooke (born 1963) 
 Blaze Foley, stage name of American country singer and songwriter Michael David Fuller (1949–1989)
 Blaze Starr, stage name of American stripper and burlesque artist Fannie Belle Fleming (1932–2015)
 Johnny Blaze, a stage name, along with Method Man, of American rapper, songwriter, record producer and actor Clifford Smith, Jr.(born 1971)
 Blaze Ya Dead Homie, also known simply as Blaze, American rapper Chris Rouleau (born 1976)
 Bobby Blaze, a ring name of American professional wrestler Robert Smedley (born 1963)
 Johnny Blaze, a ring name, along with John Morrison, of American professional wrestler John Randall Hennigan (born 1979)

Arts and entertainment

Fictional entities
 Ghost Rider (Johnny Blaze), the second Marvel Comics Ghost Rider
 Blaze (Mortal Kombat), a character from the Mortal Kombat video game series
 Blaze the Cat, a pyrokinetic princess cat from the Sonic the Hedgehog video game series
 Blaze and Satanus, comic book villains from DC Comics, enemies of Superman and Captain Marvel
 Blaze Fielding, a character from the Streets of Rage video game series
 Blaze, a character in the cartoon Beverly Hills Teens
 the title Red Monster Truck character of Blaze and the Monster Machines, a 2014 Nickelodeon cartoon
 Blaze, a horse featured in a series of children's books by C.W. Anderson
 Blaze, a firefly in Tinker Bell and the Lost Treasure
 Blaze, a special ability of some Pokémon that have the Fire-type
 Blaze, a mob from the Minecraft video game
 Blaze, the player character's callsign in the video game Ace Combat 5
 Blaze, Method Man's nickname in the video game Def Jam: Fight for NY

Films 
 Blaze (1989 film), starring Paul Newman and Lolita Davidovich, the latter as stripper Blaze Starr
 Blaze (2018 film), based on the life of country musician Blaze Foley
 Blaze (2022 film), starring Simon Baker

Music

Groups
 Blaze (group), a house-music production team formed in 1984 in New Jersey, USA
 Blaze (Japanese band), a band known for its song "Fire", which appears in the Yu-Gi-Oh! movie Pyramid of Light

Albums
 Blaze (Lagwagon album), 2003
 Blaze (Herman's Hermits album)

Songs
 "Blaze" (song), a 2008 single by J-pop singer Kotoko
 "Blaze", a single by Japanese singer Kinya Kotani

Other arts and entertainment
 Blaze (novel), a 2007 novel by Stephen King writing as Richard Bachman
 Blaze (toy), a rocking-horse riding toy produced by Mattel in the 1960s

Sports and games

Mascots
 Blaze (UAB mascot), the dragon mascot of the University of Alabama at Birmingham athletic teams
 Blaze the Phoenix, the mascot of the 1996 Summer Paralympics
 Blaze the Trail Cat, mascot of the Portland Trail Blazers professional basketball team
 Blaze the Vulcan, the mascot of the California University of Pennsylvania Vulcans

Teams

United States
 Atlanta Blaze, a former Major League Lacrosse team based in Atlanta, Georgia
 Bakersfield Blaze, a former minor league baseball team in Bakersfield, California
 Baton Rouge Blaze, a former team in the arenafootball2 league who played their home games in Baton Rouge, Louisiana
 Bloomington Blaze, former name of the Bloomington Thunder (SPHL), a Southern Professional Hockey League team based in Bloomington, Illinois
 Chicago Blaze (basketball), a National Women's Basketball League team from 2002 to 2005
 Chicago Blaze (ice hockey), an All American Hockey League team in 2008-09
 Chicago Blaze (rugby), a rugby union club founded in 1982
 Indiana Blaze, a former W-League women's soccer team based in Indianapolis, Indiana
 Utah Blaze, an Arena Football League team based in Salt Lake City

Elsewhere
 Coventry Blaze, an ice hockey team in England, known as Solihull Blaze before relocation to Coventry
 Gold Coast Blaze, an Australian basketball team based in Queensland

Other uses in sports and games
 Blaze (dinghy), a high-performance racing dinghy designed by Ian Howlett and John Caig
 Blaze, a non-standard poker hand

Businesses 
 Blaze (TV channel), a British television channel
 Blaze Europe, a video games accessory manufacturer and distributor in the UK
 Blaze Pizza, an American pizza chain

Places 
 Blaze, Kentucky, United States, an unincorporated community
 Blaze Island, Nunavut, Canada

Other uses
 Blaze (horse marking), an equine coat marking
 Blaze (software), a tool to automate software building and testing
 Blaze, a C++ math library

See also
 The Blaze (disambiguation)
 Alundra Blayze, later stage name for former female professional wrestler Debrah Miceli (born 1964), also known as Madusa
 Sonny Blayze, former manager of professional wrestling tag-team The Powers of Pain
 Blaaze (born 1975), Indian rapper and playback singer
 Blaise (disambiguation)
 Blazer (disambiguation)
 Blazing (disambiguation)